Mudan Auto is a Chinese bus manufacturer headquartered in Zhangjiagang, Jiangsu province.  It was founded in 1998 as part of the Jiangsu Mudan Automobile Group Co, Ltd.. The company has an annual output of up to 20,000 buses, making it one of the largest bus producers.

Models
Mudan K-series/ K6/ K7/ K8  Mini bus
Mudan G-series City bus
Mudan L-series Mini bus
Mudan X-series Mini bus
Mudan MD5061 Mini bus
Mudan MD6100EV City bus
Mudan MD6106 City bus
Mudan MD6110 Tourist bus
Mudan MD6601 Mini bus
Mudan MD6608 Mini bus
Mudan MD6609 Mini bus
Mudan MD6669 Mini bus
Mudan MD6701 Mini bm us
Mudan MD6703 Mini bus
Mudan MD6720 City bus
Mudan MD6728 Mini bus
Mudan MD6750 City bus
Mudan MD6820 City bus

References

External links
Mudan Auto official website

Bus manufacturers of China
Manufacturing companies based in Suzhou
Zhangjiagang
Vehicle manufacturing companies established in 1998
Chinese brands